William Charles Gardner (2 March 1929 – 9 October 2012) was a rugby union player who represented Australia.

Gardiner, a fullback, claimed 1 international rugby cap for Australia.

References

Australian rugby union players
Australia international rugby union players
1929 births
2012 deaths
Rugby union players from New South Wales
Rugby union fullbacks